Stål Aanderaa (born 1 February 1931) is a Norwegian mathematician.

Biography 
Aanderaa was born in Beitstad. He completed the mag.scient. degree in 1959 and his doctorate at Harvard University in 1966. He was a professor at the University of Oslo from 1978 to his retirement in 2001.

Aanderaa is a member of the Norwegian Academy of Science and Letters.

Work 
Aanderaa is one of the namesakes of the Aanderaa–Karp–Rosenberg conjecture.

References

1931 births
Living people
Norwegian mathematicians
Harvard Graduate School of Arts and Sciences alumni
Norwegian expatriates in the United States
Academic staff of the University of Oslo
Members of the Norwegian Academy of Science and Letters
People from Steinkjer